This is a list of military equipment in service with the People's Liberation Army Ground Force, either presently, or former equipment that has since been replaced.

Individual equipment

Small arms and light weapons

Small arms

Grenades, explosives, and missiles

Mortars and recoilless rifles

Other

Export-oriented 
 QX-04 – highly modular rotating barrel semi-automatic pistol that can be chambered in 9×19mm Parabellum, .45 ACP, 7.62×25mm Tokarev, .40 S&W. In limited service with PLA and Chinese law enforcement.
 CS/LP5 (CF-07) – Semi-automatic 9×19mm Parabellum compact pistol based on QSZ-92-9. Designated for military officers and export customer. 
 P19 – Semi-automatic pistol in 9×19mm Parabellum.
 P12 – Semi-automatic pistol in 9×19mm Parabellum.
 JH-16-1 – Submachine gun chambered in 9×19mm Parabellum. Used by Chinese law enforcement.
 CS/LS7 – Submachine gun chambered in 9×19mm Parabellum. Used by Chinese law enforcement and export customers.
 CS/LS06 – Submachine gun chambered in 9×19mm Parabellum 50-round helical magazine. Used by Chinese law enforcement and export customers.
 CS/LS5 – Submachine gun chambered in 9×19mm Parabellum. 30-round magazine. 
 CS/LS3 – Submachine gun chambered in 9×19mm Parabellum. 50-round magazine. Limited service. 
 CS/LS2 (JS 9) – Bullpup submachine gun chambered in 5.8×21mm and 9×19mm Parabellum. 30-round magazine. Commercial version of QCQ-05, also known as JS 9mm. Used by Chinese Armored Police.
 CS/LR17 – Modular rifle family with Assault rifle, Battle rifle, Carbine, Marksman rifle variants. The weapon can be chambered in 5.56×45mm, 5.8×42mm, 7.62×39mm, 7.62×51mm. Unveiled at the 2016 Zhuhai Airshow.
 CS/LR14 – Battle rifle chambered in 30-round 7.62×51mm magazine.
 Norinco CQ – Assault rifle chambered in 5.56×45mm NATO. 30-round magazine. Export only. Based on the M16.
 M305 – Battle rifle chambered in 7.62×51mm NATO. Chinese version of the M14 rifle.
 CS/LR19 – Semi-automatic rifle chambered in 7.62×54mmR. Derived from the Type 85 sniper rifle, and can accept Dragunov magazines.
 JS 7.62 – Bolt action sniper rifle chambered in 7.62×54mmR. Police and export-oriented project. Predecessor of CS/LR4.
 XY 8.6 – Bolt action rifle chambered in .338 Lapua Magnum
 CS/LR17 – Modualr Light machine gun chambered in 5.56×45mm, 7.62×39mm, or 7.62×51mm. Export oriented.
 CQ 7.62mm – General-purpose machine gun chambered in 7.62×51mm NATO. Belt-fed, export-oriented, based on FN MAG.
 CS/LM6 – Heavy machine gun chambered in .50 BMG Copy of the M2 Browning. Export-oriented. Not in service.
 CS/LM5 – Three-barrels rotary machine gun in 12.7×108mm. Export-oriented.
 Hua Qing minigun – 7.62×54mmR Rotary cannon. Export-oriented.
 CS/LR13 (NSG-50) – Bolt-action anti-materiel rifle chambered in 12.7×108mm.
 CS/LR12 (NSG-127) – Semi-automatic anti-materiel rifle chambered in 12.7×108mm. Also used by Turkmenistan.
 CS/LR5 – Bolt-action anti-materiel rifle chambered in 12.7×108mm
 JS 12.7 (JS 05) – Bolt action anti-materiel rifle chambered in 12.7×108mm. A variant of the JS 7.62 sniper rifle.
 Norinco LG6 – Automatic grenade launcher chambered in 40x46mm. Export-oriented. Selective fire, uses drum magazines.
 Norinco LG4 – Revolver grenade launcher charmed in 40x46mm. Export-oriented. 6-round cylinder magazine.
 Norinco LG3 – Automatic grenade launcher chambered in 40x53mm. Export-oriented. Belt fed.
 W86 mortar – 120mm mortar developed around 1980s.
 GAM-10X – Anti-tank guided missile with tandem shaped charge HEAT developed for export customer. Roughly equivalent to HJ-12 adopted by the PLA. Two variants have been produced in 2021, the GAM-100 and GAM-102.

Reserve and retired 
 Type 84 – Semi-automatic pistol chambered in 7.62×17mm Type 84. Phasing out. Designated for military officers. 
 Type 77 – Semi-automatic pistol chamberd in 7.62×17mm and 9×19mm Parabellum. Phasing out. 7-round magazine. 
 Type 54  – Semi-automatic pistol chambered in 7.62×25mm Tokarev. 8-round magazine. Based on the TT-33. Limited service.
 Type 59  – Semi-automatic pistol chambered in 9×18mm Makarov. Based on the Makarov PM. Limited service.
 Type 67 – Integrally suppressed pistol chambered in 7.65×17mm rimless ball. Used by Special Forces. Improved variant of Type 64 silenced pistol.
 Type 64 – Semi-automatic pistol chambered in 7.62×17mm Type 64.
 Type 80 – Machine pistol chambered in 7.62×25mm Tokarev. Designated for military officers. Limited service.
 Type 85 – Integrally suppressed submachine gun chambered in 7.62×25mm Type 51. 30-round magazine. Used by recon units and special forces. Replaced by QCW-05
 Type 82 – Submachine gun chamberd in 9×18mm Makarov. 15 or 25-round magazine. It is based on the design of Polish PM-63, which was captured from the Vietnamese army. Limited service in the Special Forces.
 Type 64 – Integrally suppressed submachine gun chambered in 7.62×25mm Type 51. 30-round magazine. Has an internal suppressor. Limited service in the Special Forces.
 Type 63 – Assault rifle chambered in 7.62×39mm M43. 20-round magazine. 
 Type 56 – Assault rifle chambered in 7.62×39mm M43. 30-round magazine. Serving in the Militia, Reserve Forces and limited serve in Special Force. Based on the AK-47/ AKM.
 Type 67 machine gun – General-purpose machine gun chambered in 7.62×54mmR with 100-round magazine or 250-round belt. Replaced the Type 53 (SG-43) and Type 57 (SGM) general purpose machine guns.
 FHJ-84 – 62mm Double-barreled incendiary rocket launcher. Adopted in 1984. Replaced by FHJ-01.
 Type 70 – Disposable Rocket launcher in 62mm. It's derived from the M72 LAW and developed in 1970s.
 Type 59 – Frag grenade adopted in 1959. Copy of the RGD-5.
 PF-65 (B-10) – 82mm recoilless rifle. In service as of 1965.

Artillery

Gun artillery

Multiple rocket artillery

Anti-aircraft artillery

Other

Export-oriented

 PLZ-45 – 155mm self-propelled tracked howitzer. Export version of the PLZ-05.
 SH-15 – 155mm truck-mounted self-propelled howitzer. Export version of the PCL-181.
 SH-9 – 120mm truck-mounted self-propelled howitzer.
 SH-5 – 105mm truck-mounted self-propelled howitzer.
 SH-3 – 122mm armored self-propelled howitzer. Export version of the PLZ-89.
 SH-1 – 155 mm/52 caliber truck-mounted self-propelled howitzer. Similar in concept to French CAESAR self-propelled howitzer.
 CS/SM10 – 120 mm all terrain vehicle mounted self-propelled mortar-howitzer.
 CS/SH4 – 122mm truck-mounted self-propelled howitzer.
 CS/SS6 – 81 mm all terrain vehicle mounted self-propelled mortar.
 CS/SM4 – – 120 mm self-propelled mortar.
 CS/SM1 – 81 mm rapid fire self-propelled mortar. Export version of the PCP-001.
 AH-4 – 155 mm towed howitzer.
 AH-2 – 155 mm towed howitzer. Export version of the PLL-01 howitzer.
 AH-1 – 155 mm towed howitzer. Export version of the PLL-01 howitzer at 52 caliber.
 FGT-203 – 203 mm towed howitzer. Experimental design based on PLL-01. This artillery system was developed by Norinco in cooperation with Space Research International of Belgium.

 SY400 – strategic MLRS, first unveiled at the 2008 Zhuhai Airshow
 SY300 – strategic MLRS, first unveiled at the 2008 Zhuhai Airshow
 A-300 – 300 mm
 A-200 – 300 mm
 SR-5/SR-7
 AR3 – 300 mm
 PHL03 – 300 mm, Chinese copy of Russian BM-30 Smerch
 AR2 – 300 mm
 AR1A – 300 mm
 WS-3
 WS-2
 WS-1 and WS-1B – an 8 and 4 tube 320 mm multiple launch rocket system by Sichuan Aerospace Industry Corporation (SCAIC, also known as Base 062)
 WS-6
 WS-15
 WS-22
 WS-32
 WS-33
 WS-35
 WS-43
 WS-63
 WS-64
 A-100 MRL – 10 tube 300 mm Multiple Rocket Launcher System
 Type 81 – 122 mm
 PR50 – 122 mm
 SR-4 – 122 mm
 WM-80 – 273 mm Multiple Rocket Launcher Systems
 WM-40 – 273 mm
 Type 90 – 30×130 mm
 Type 82 artillery (on a Yanan SX250 6×6 truck) – 30 tube 130 mm multiple rocket launcher replacing the 19 tube 130 mm multiple rocket launcher of the Type 70 (on a YW 531C) and Type 63 (on a 4×4 truck)
 Type 90 – 40 × 122 mm rockets
 Type 81 – 40 × 122 mm rockets
 Type 82 – 130 × 130 mm rockets
 Type 70 – 122 mm
 Type 762 – 284 mm
 Type 74 – 284 mm
 Type 70 – 19 × 130 mm
 Type 65 – rocket system
 Type 63 – 130 mm
 Type 63 – 107 mm 

 SW1
 CS/AA3
 Type 85 Shengong – 2 X 23mm truck-towed, computer-controlled air defense system
 Type 85 AAG (WZ554) – 2 X 23 mm, copy of the Soviet ZU-23-2.
 Type 72 – 85 mm, reported to be the Chinese copy of Soviet M1939 (52-K)
 Type 59 – 57 mm, copy of the Soviet 57 mm AZP S-60.
 Type 65/74 – 2 X 37 mm, twin barrel copy of the Soviet 37 mm automatic air defense gun M1939.
 Type 59 – 100 mm, copy of the Soviet KS-19 gun.
 Type 85/YW 306 – 23mm
 Type 59 – 57mm Chinese copy of the S-60 57mm Anti Aircraft Gun.
 BK1060 – 35mm. Export variant of the PGL-12.

Reserve and retired
 Type 83 SPH – 152 mm self-propelled howitzer.
 Type 54-1 (PL-54-1) – 122 mm towed howitzer.
 Type 66 (PL-66) – 122 mm towed howitzer.
 Type 83 (PL-83) – 122 mm towed howitzer.
 Type 86 (PL-66) – 122 mm towed howitzer.
 Type 66 (PL-66) – 152 mm towed howitzer. copy of the Soviet D-20
 Type 54 (PL-54) – 152 mm towed howitzer.
 Type 59 and Type 59-1 (PL-59/PL-59-1) – copy of the Soviet M46 130 mm towed field gun
 Type 60 (PL-60) – copy of the Soviet D-74 122 mm howitzer
 Type 83 MLRS – 273 mm multiple rocket launcher in limited service. Retired.

Vehicle

Armored combat vehicles

Anti-tank/anti-structure vehicles

Logistic and support vehicles

Other

Export-oriented
 ZFB-91 – Export-oriented 6x6 light-weight armored personnel carrier, limited service in PLAGF and Chinese People's Armed Police.
 Type 90 – Export-oriented armored personnel carrier based on Type 85. Limited services within PLAGF.
 Type 85 – Export-oriented armored personnel carrier developed alongside the Type 89 armored fighting vehicle. Limited services within PLAGF.
 Type 81 – Export variant of Type 63 armored personnel carrier 
 CS/VP3 – Export-oriented mine resistant, ambush protected vehicle (MRAP) developed by Poly Technologies.
  8M – Export-oriented mine resistant, ambush protected vehicle (MRAP) jointly developed by Norinco and South African firm EWI2 for China, first revealed in mid-2012.
 VN4 – Export-oriented 4x4 armored Car small quantity were produced for testing within PLAGF.

Reserve and retired
 Type 77 – Amphibious armored personnel carrier used in 1980s.
 Shaanxi SX2110 – Standard tactical truck of PLAGF since 1980s.
 Shaanxi SX2300 – Standard tactical truck of PLAGF since 1980s.
 FAW CA-141 – Retired. General Utility Truck. Standard tactical truck of PLAGF since 1980s.
 Taian TA4360 – Tank transporter of PLAGF in 1980s.
 Taian TA5380 – Heavy artillery truck.
 Taian TA5450 – Heavy artillery truck.
 Wanshan WS580 – Heavy artillery truck. Chinese licensed copy of Belarus MAZ-537.
 Wanshan WS2300 – Heavy artillery truck.
 Wanshan WS2400 – Heavy artillery truck. Chinese licensed copy of Belarus MAZ-543
 Wanshan WS2600 – Heavy artillery truck.

 Kamaz-4326 – In limited service. General Utility Truck. Standard tactical truck of PLAGF since 1990s.
 Kamaz-43114/43118 – In limited service. Heavy high mobility and tactical truck.
 KrAZ-6322 – In limited service. Heavy high mobility and tactical truck
 BJ212 – In limited service. Originally developed from UAZ-460. Standard light utility & off-road vehicle in 1960s to 2000s.
 Dongfeng EQ1108 – Retired. General Utility Truck
 ZIL-4331 – Retired. General Utility Truck
 Yuejin NJ-130 – Retired. General Utility Truck, license-built GAZ-51
 Yuejin NJ-230 – Retired. General Utility Truck, license-built GAZ-63
 GAZ-53 – Retired. General Utility Truck
 FAW CA-6440 – Retired. Light utility van. Reverse engineered from Nissan Caravan E24.
 GAZ-66 – Retired. General Utility Truck
 FAW CA-10 – Retired. General Utility Truck, license-built ZIS-150, China's first domestic built truck type. Standard tactical truck of PLAGF in 1950s to 1980s.
 FAW CA-30 – Retired. General Utility Truck, license-built ZIL-157
 ZIL-130 – Retired. General Utility Truck. Standard tactical truck of PLAGF in 1960s to 1990s.
 ZIL-131 – Retired. General Utility Truck
 Kamaz-5320 – Retired. General Utility Truck
 Kamaz-53212/53215 – Retired. Heavy high mobility and tactical truck
 KrAZ-214 – Retired. Heavy high mobility and tactical truck
 KrAZ-255 – Retired. Heavy high mobility and tactical truck

 GAZ-69 – Retired. Standard light utility & off-road vehicle in 1950s to 1990s.
 GAZ-69A – Retired. Standard light utility & off-road vehicle in 1950s to 1990s.
 UAZ-452 – In limited service. Light utility & off-road van in reserve
 UAZ-469 – In limited service. Standard light utility & off-road vehicle in 1970s to 2000s.
 GAC Changfeng Leopard – Chinese licensed version of the Mitsubishi Pajero. Standard light utility & off-road vehicle since 1990s.
 Toyota Land Cruiser – In limited service. Light utility vehicle.

Vessel

Aircraft

Equipment summary (2021) 
Data estimated by The International Institute for Strategic Studies. Antiquated, auxiliary, stored, and land vehicles of other service branches are not included.

Land vehicle
 Armored fighting vehicles: 22,921
 Main battle tanks: 5,650
 ZTZ-59/ZTZ-59-II Tank: 600
 ZTZ-59D Tank: 600
 ZTZ-79 Tank: 200
 ZTZ-88A/ZTZ-88B Tank: 300
 ZTZ-96 Tank: 1,000
 ZTZ-96A Tank: 1,500
 ZTZ-99 Tank: 600
 ZTZ-99A: 600
 Light tanks: 600
 ZTQ-15 Light Tank, 250
 ZTD-05 Light Tank, 250
 ZTS-63A Light Tank, 100
 Assault vehicle: 1,200
 ZTL-11 Assault Gun: 950
 PTL-02 Assault Gun: 250
 Infantry fighting vehicles: 6,700
 ZBD-04 Infantry Fighting Vehicle: 400
 ZBD-04A Infantry Fighting Vehicle: 1,900
 ZBL-08 Infantry Fighting Vehicle: 2,000
 ZBD-86 Infantry Fighting Vehicle: 600
 ZBD-86A Infantry Fighting Vehicle: 650
 ZSL-92 Infantry Fighting Vehicle: 550
 ZSL-92B Infantry Fighting Vehicle: 600
 Armored personnel carrier: 3,950
 ZSD-63 Tracked Armoured Personnel Carrier: 750
 ZSD-63C Tracked Armoured Personnel Carrier: 200
 ZSD-89 Tracked Armoured Personnel Carrier: 1,750
 ZSL-92A Wheeled Armoured Personnel Carrier: 700
 ZSL-10 Wheeled Armoured Personnel Carrier: 500
 ZSL-93 Wheeled Armoured Personnel Carrier: 50
 Amphibious assault vehicle: 600
 ZBD-05 Amphibious Assault Vehicle: 600
 Armoured utility vehicle: N/A
 Dongfeng Mengshi Armoured Utility Vehicle
 Tiger 4×4 Armored Utility Vehicle
 Engineering and maintenance vehicles: N/A
 Type-73 Armored Recovery Vehicle
 Type-84 Armored Recovery Vehicle
 Type-85 Armored Recovery Vehicle
 Type-97 Armored Recovery Vehicle
 Type-654 Armored Recovery Vehicle
 KMM Armored Vehicle Launched Bridge
 MTU Armored Vehicle Launched Bridge
 TMM Armored Vehicle Launched Bridge
 Type-84A Armored Vehicle Launched Bridge
 Type-74 Mine Warfare Vehicle
 Type-79 Mine Warfare Vehicle
 Type-81-II Mine Warfare Vehicle
 Type-84 Mine Warfare Vehicle
 Anti-tank/Anti-infrastructure: 1000+
 HJ-8 Vehicle-Mounted Missile: 450
 HJ-9 Vehicle-Mounted Missile: 450
 HJ-10 Self-Propelled Missile Launcher: 100
 HJ-73D Man-Portable Anti-Tank System
 HJ-8A Man-Portable Anti-Tank System
 HJ-8C Man-Portable Anti-Tank System
 HJ-8E Man-Portable Anti-Tank System
 HJ-11 Man-Portable Anti-Tank System
 Recoilless rifles: 3,966
 PF-56 75mm Recoilless Rifle
 PF-65 (B-10) 82mm Recoilless Rifle
 PF-78 82mm Recoilless Rifle
 PF-75 105mm Recoilless Rifle
 PF-98 120mm Recoilless Rifle
 Tank destroyers/Guns: 230
 PTZ-89 120mm Self-Propelled Gun: 230
 PT-73/PT-86 100mm Towed Gun: 1,308
 Artillery: 9,204+
 Self-propelled howitzers: 2,350+
 PLZ-89 122mm Self-Propelled Howitzer: 500
 PLZ-07A 122mm Self-Propelled Howitzer: 350
 PLZ-07B 122mm Self-Propelled Howitzer: 150
 PCL-09 122mmmm Self-Propelled Howitzer: 300
 PLL-09 122mm Self-Propelled Howitzer: 350
 PCL-161 122mm Self-Propelled Howitzer: 30
 PCL-171 122mm Self-Propelled Howitzer: N/A
 PLZ-83A/B 152mm Self-Propelled Howitzer: 150
 PLZ-05 155mm Self-Propelled Howitzer: 320
 PCL-181 155mm Self-Propelled Howitzer: 200
 Towed howitzers: 1,234
 PL-96 122mm Towed Howitzer: 500 (2,800 in store: PL-54-1/PL-83/PL-60/PL-96)
 PL-59/PL-59-I 130mm Towed Howitzer: 234
 PL-66 152mm Towed Howitzer: 500 (1,600 in store: PL-54/PL-66 (D-20)
 Self-propelled gun-mortars: 1,716+
 PLL-05 120mm Towed Gun-Mortar: 450
 PLZ-10 120mm Towed Gun-Mortar: 800
 PCP-001 82mm Self-Propelled Mortar: 466
 Multiple rocket launcher systems: 
 PH-63 107mm Multiple Rocket Launcher System: 1,570+
 PHL-81/90 122mm Multiple Rocket Launcher System: 550+ (700 in store)
 PHL-11 122mm Multiple Rocket Launcher System: 350
 PHZ-89 122mm Multiple Rocket Launcher System: 375
 PHZ-11 122mm Multiple Rocket Launcher System: 100
 PHL-03 300mm Multiple Rocket Launcher System: 175
 PHL-16 370mm Multiple Rocket Launcher System: 20+
 Mortars:
 PP-53/PP-67/PP-82/PP-87 82mm Towed Mortar: 2,880
 PP-89 60mm Portable Mortar: N/A
 Surface-to-air missiles: 614+
 HQ-16/HQ-16B Medium-Range Surface-to-Air Missile System: 200
 HQ-17 Short-Range Surface-to-Air Missile System: 140
 HQ-17A Short-Range Surface-to-Air Missile System: 20+
 9K331 Short-Range Surface-to-Air Missile System: 24
 HQ-6D Short-Range Surface-to-Air Missile System: 30
 HQ-7A/B Short-Range Surface-to-Air Missile System: 200
 HN-5A Point-Defense Surface-to-Air Missile System: N/A
 HN-5B Point-Defense Surface-to-Air Missile System: N/A
 FN-6 Point-Defence Surface-to-Air Missile System: N/A
 QW-1/QW-2 Point-Defence Surface-to-Air Missile System: N/A
 Self-propelled anti-aircraft guns: 396+
 PGZ-04A 25mm Self-Propelled Anti-Aircraft Gun: 270
 PGL-12 30mm Self-Propelled Anti-Aircraft Gun: some
 PGZ-09 35mm Self-Propelled Anti-Aircraft Gun: 120
 PGZ-88 37mm Self-Propelled Anti-Aircraft Gun: 6
 Towed anti-aircraft guns: 7000+
 PG-87 25mm Towed Anti-Aircraft Gun
 PG-99 35mm Towed Anti-Aircraft Gun
 PG-55 37mm Towed Anti-Aircraft Gun
 PG-65 37mm Towed Anti-Aircraft Gun
 PG-74 37mm Towed Anti-Aircraft Gun
 PG-59 57mm Towed Anti-Aircraft Gun
 PG-59 100mm Towed Anti-Aircraft Gun

Aircraft

References 

People's Liberation Army Ground Force
People's Liberation Army Ground Force
Chinese military-related lists
People's Liberation Army Ground Force